The 2012 Burlington mayoral election was held March 6, 2012. Incumbent mayor Bob Kiss did not contest for the re-election. Democratic nominee Miro Weinberger was elected with 57% of the popular vote.

Background
Incumbent Progressive mayor Kiss was first elected in 2006. Democratic nominee Miro Weinberger, Republican nominee and State Representative Kurt Wright, and Independent candidate Wendy Hines ran to succeed Kiss.

Election Results

References

Burlington, Vermont
2012
Burlington Mayor